The 1st Armored Brigade Combat Team, 1st Armored Division is an Armored Brigade Combat Team of the United States Army, stationed at Fort Bliss, TX.

First organized in 1942, as Combat Command A, 1st Armored Division, the unit has fought in North Africa and Italy in World War II, as well as 4 tours in Operation Iraqi Freedom.  As the 3rd Constabulary Regiment, the brigade conducted stability operations in Germany after World War II. After service at Fort Hood and in Germany during the Cold War, the brigade conducted three peacekeeping rotations in the Balkans (Bosnia, Macedonia and Kosovo).

Organization
The current organization of the brigade, as of November 2019, is as follows;

 1st Armored Brigade Headquarters and Headquarters Company
 6th Squadron, 1st Cavalry Regiment (6-1 CAV)
 2nd Battalion, 37th Armor Regiment (2-37 AR)
 4th Battalion, 70th Armor Regiment (4-70 AR)
 1st Battalion, 36th Infantry Regiment (1-36 INF)
 2nd Battalion, 3rd Field Artillery Regiment (2-3 FAR)
 16th Engineer Battalion (16 ENG)
 501st Brigade Support Battalion (501 BSB)

Lineage
Organized  in the Regular Army at Fort Knox, Kentucky, as Headquarters and Headquarters Detachment, Combat Command A, 1st Armored Division on January 1, 1942.
Reorganized and redesignated as Headquarters and Headquarters Company, Combat Command A, 1st Armored Division on July 20, 1944.
Converted and redesignated on May 1, 1946 as Headquarters and Headquarters Troop, 3d Constabulary Regiment, and relieved from assignment to the 1st Armored Division
The unit was Inactivated September 20, 1947 in Germany.
Converted and redesignated 27 February 1951 as Headquarters and Headquarters Company, Combat Command A, 1st Armored Division
Activated 7 March 1951 at Fort Hood, Texas
Reorganized and redesignated 3 February 1962 as Headquarters and Headquarters Company, 1st Brigade, 1st Armored Division
Headquarters, 1st Brigade, 1st Armored Division, reorganized and redesignated 16 September 2008 as Headquarters, 1st Brigade Combat Team, 1st Armored Division (Headquarters Company, 1st Brigade, 1st Armored Division, concurrently reorganized and redesignated as Special Troops Battalion, 1st Brigade Combat Team, 1st Armored Division)
Headquarters, 1st Brigade Combat Team, 1st Armored Division, consolidated 16 January 2011 with Special Troops Battalion, 1st Brigade Combat Team, 1st Armored Division, and consolidated unit concurrently reorganized and redesignated as Headquarters and Headquarters Company, 1st Brigade Combat Team, 1st Armored Division

Campaign Participation Credit
The 1st Armored Brigade Combat Team, 1st Armored Division participated in the World War II campaigns of: Tunisia; Naples-Foggia; Anzio; Rome-Arno; North Apennines; and Po Valley.

In the War On Terrorism, the brigade has participated in Operation Iraqi Freedom and Operation Freedom Sentinel.

Decorations
 Presidential Unit Citation (Army), Streamer embroidered IRAQ 2004
 Meritorious Unit Commendation (Army), Streamer embroidered IRAQ 2009-2010
 Navy Unit Commendation, Streamer embroidered ANBAR PROVINCE 2006-2007
 Army Superior Unit Award, Streamer embroidered 1995-1996

Headquarters Company additionally entitled to:
 Meritorious Unit Commendation (Army), Streamer embroidered IRAQ NOV 2009-NOV 2010

References

External links
Official Unit Page
Brigade Official Facebook Page
4-17 IN Official Facebook Page
1-36 IN Official Facebook Page
3-41 IN Official Facebook Page
2-3 FA Official Facebook Page
16th EN Official Facebook Page
501st BSB Official Facebook Page

Armored Division 001 01
Armored Division 001 01
Armored 001 01
Military units and formations established in 1942
1942 establishments in the United States